Cheatwood is a surname. Notable people with the surname include:

Joel Cheatwood, American television executive
Jonni Cheatwood (born 1986), Brazilian-American artist
Tim Cheatwood (born 1978), American football player
Vicki Caroline Cheatwood, American playwright and screenwriter